Los Extraterrestres may refer to:
Los Extraterrestres, a 1983 Argentine film
Wisin vs. Yandel: Los Extraterrestres, a 2007 album by Wisin & Yandel

See also
Extraterrestrial (disambiguation)